The inconspicuous blue-eye (Pseudomugil inconspicuus) is a species of fish in the subfamily Pseudomugilinae. It is found in Papua New Guinea and Australia's Top End.

References

Fish of New Guinea
Pseudomugil
Taxa named by Tyson R. Roberts
Fish described in 1978